RMS Queen Mary 2 (also referred to as the QM2) is a British transatlantic ocean liner. She has served as the flagship of Cunard Line since succeeding Queen Elizabeth 2 in 2004. As of 2022, Queen Mary 2 is the only ocean liner (as opposed to a cruise ship) still in service.

The ship was officially named Queen Mary 2 by Queen Elizabeth II in 2004 after the first  of 1936. Queen Mary had in turn been named after Mary of Teck, consort of King George V. With the retirement of Queen Elizabeth 2 in 2008, Queen Mary 2 is the only transatlantic ocean liner in regular service between Southampton, England, and New York City, United States. The ship is also used for cruising, including an annual world cruise.

She was designed by a team of British naval architects led by Stephen Payne, and was constructed in France by Chantiers de l'Atlantique. She no longer holds these records after the construction of Royal Caribbean International's   (a cruise ship) in April 2006, but remains the largest ocean liner ever built.

Queen Mary 2 was intended for regular scheduled crossings of the Atlantic Ocean; the final construction cost was approximately $300,000 per berth. The cost was increased by the high quality of materials; having been designed as an ocean liner, 40% more steel was required than for a standard cruise ship. Instead of the common diesel-electric configuration, Queen Mary 2 uses integrated electric propulsion to achieve her top speed. Diesel engines, augmented by gas turbines, are used to generate electricity for electric motors for propulsion and for on-board use.

Queen Mary 2s facilities include fifteen restaurants and bars, five swimming pools, a casino, a ballroom, a theatre, and the first planetarium at sea.

Characteristics
Queen Mary 2 is the flagship of Cunard Line. She was constructed to replace the ageing Queen Elizabeth 2, which was the Cunard flagship from 1969 to 2004 and the last major ocean liner built before Queen Mary 2. Queen Mary 2 had the Royal Mail Ship (RMS) prefix conferred on her by the Royal Mail when she entered service in 2004, as a gesture to Cunard's history.

Queen Mary 2 is not a steamship like many of her predecessors, but is powered primarily by four diesel engines, with two additional gas turbines providing extra power when required; this integrated electric propulsion configuration is used to produce the power to drive her four electric propulsion pods as well as the ship's hotel services. The spaces for these prime movers are also split, and controls are also backed up, with the intention of preventing a single failure from disabling the ship.

Like her predecessor Queen Elizabeth 2 she is built for crossing the Atlantic Ocean, and is also regularly used for cruising. In the winter season she cruises from New York to the Caribbean on twelve or thirteen day tours. While the hull of a cruise ship will typically have a block coefficient of 0.73 (1.0 would represent a rectangular block) Queen Mary 2 is more fine-lined, with a block coefficient of 0.61.

Design and construction

In December 1998, Cunard released details of Project Queen Mary, the project to develop a liner that would complement Queen Elizabeth 2. Harland and Wolff of Northern Ireland, Aker Kværner of Norway, Fincantieri of Italy, Meyer Werft of Germany, and Chantiers de l'Atlantique of France were invited to bid on the project. The contract was finally signed with Chantiers de l'Atlantique, a subsidiary of Alstom, on 6 November 2000.

The QM2's keel was laid down on 4 July 2002, in the construction dock at Saint-Nazaire, France, with the hull number G32. Approximately 3,000 craftsmen spent around eight million working hours on the ship, and around 20,000 people were directly or indirectly involved in her design, construction, and fitting out. In total, 300,000 pieces of steel were assembled into 94 "blocks" off the dry dock, which were then positioned and welded together to complete the hull and superstructure.
After floating out on 21 March 2003, the Queen Mary 2 was fitted out in the large fitting out basin ("Bassin C"), the first ship to use this huge dry dock since the shipyard built large tankers in the 1970s, such as the MV Gastor. Her sea trials were conducted during 25–29 September and 7–11 November 2003, between Saint-Nazaire and the offshore islands of Île d'Yeu and Belle-Île.

2003 dry dock accident
The final stages of construction were marred by a fatal accident on 15 November 2003, when a gangway collapsed under a group of shipyard workers and their relatives who had been invited to visit the vessel. In total, 16 people were killed and another 32 people injured after a  fall into the drydock.<ref>{{cite web | url = http://www.ctv.ca/servlet/ArticleNews/story/CTVNews/20031116/quennmary2gangwaycollapse_20031116?s_name=&no_ads= | archive-url = https://web.archive.org/web/20100523180208/http://www.ctv.ca/servlet/ArticleNews/story/CTVNews/20031116/quennmary2gangwaycollapse_20031116?s_name=&no_ads= | url-status = dead | archive-date = 23 May 2010 | publisher = CTV News | title = Toll climbs in Queen Mary 2 shipyard accident | date = 2003-11-16}}</ref>

Construction was completed on schedule. On 22 December 2003, Queen Mary 2 left Saint-Nazaire and arrived in Southampton, England, on 26 December 2003. On 8 January 2004, the liner was officially named by Queen Elizabeth II.Davidson, Carla. "Long Live the Queens",American Heritage, August/September 2005. 

ExteriorQueen Mary 2s principal naval architect was Carnival's in-house designer, Stephen Payne. He intended many aspects of the ship's design to resemble notable aspects of former ocean liners, such as Queen Elizabeth 2 and the ship's predecessor Queen Mary. These include the three thick black lines  known as "hands that wrap around either edge of the ship's bridge screen, and at the stern end of the superstructure, which are to recall the appearance of the crossovers of the forward decks on the first Queen Mary.Queen Mary 2 has  of exterior deck space, with wind screens to shield passengers in rough seas. The ship was originally constructed with five swimming pools. However, the shallow "Splash Pool" on Deck 13 was removed during the ship's 2016 refurbishment to make room for additional staterooms. Two of her remaining four swimming pools are outdoors. There are indoor pools on Deck 7, in the Canyon Ranch Spa Club, and on Deck 12. The Pavilion Pool on Deck 12 is covered with a retractable magrodome.

The flanking promenades are created by the need to step the superstructure to allow space for lifeboats.

Payne's original intention was for a stern profile with a spoon shape, similar to most previous liners, but the mounting of the propeller pods required a flat transom. The compromise was a Costanzi stern – a combination of the two, which provides the transom required for azimuthal pod propulsors and has better seaholding characteristics in a following swell. In common with many modern ships, Queen Mary 2 has a bulbous bow to reduce drag and thereby increase speed, range, and fuel efficiency.

While of a design similar to that of Queen Elizabeth 2, Queen Mary 2s funnel has a slightly different shape, because a taller funnel would have made it impossible for the ship to pass under the Verrazano-Narrows Bridge in New York City at high tide.

As Queen Mary 2 is too large to dock in many ports, passengers are often ferried to and from the ship in tenders, which can also be used as lifeboats. These are stored at sea in davits alongside the lifeboats. To transport passengers ashore the tenders pull up to one of four loading stations, each of which has a large hull door that opens hydraulically to form a boarding platform, complete with railings and decking.Queen Mary 2 is a post-Panamax ship, too wide to use the Panama Canal before its expansion in 2016. As a result, she had to circumnavigate South America to transit between the Atlantic and Pacific oceans. The decision not to constrain her width to transit the Panama Canal was taken as Queen Elizabeth 2 only transited once a year, during the world cruise. Cunard decided to pass up the convenience of the occasional passage in favour of a greater passenger capacity.

Interior
As is the case with many modern passenger ships, many of the major public rooms on board Queen Mary 2 are on the lowest public decks of the ship, with the passenger cabins stacked above.  This is the opposite of the traditional practice on ocean liners, but the design allowed for larger rooms to be contained within the stronger hull, as well as for more passenger cabins to have private balconies higher up on the ship, where they are less affected by large waves. Payne attempted to create a central axis to the two main public room decks (similar in fashion to the Normandie), but a full vista is broken by various public rooms that span the full beam of the ship. The dining rooms were placed further aft, though not directly at the stern, where the fore-and-aft pitching of the ship is most noticeable, and might cause discomfort to dining passengers.

Deck 2, the lowest passenger deck, contains the Illuminations theatre, cinema and planetarium (the first at sea); Royal Court Theatre; Grand Lobby; "Empire Casino"; "Golden Lion Pub"; and the lower level of the "Britannia Restaurant". Deck 3 holds the upper levels of "Illuminations", the "Royal Court theatre" and the "Britannia Restaurant", as well as a small shopping arcade, "Veuve Cliquot champagne bar", the "Chart Room", "Sir Samuel's" wine bar, the "Queen's Room", and the "G32" Nightclub. The other main public deck is Deck 7, on which are the "Canyon Ranch Spa", "Carinthia Lounge", "King's Court", the "Queen's Grill Lounge", and the "Queen's Grill" and "Princess Grill" restaurants for higher-fare passengers. The public rooms on Deck 8 include the à la carte "Verandah Restaurant" an 8,000-volume library (the largest of any cruise ship), a book shop and the upper part of the Canyon Ranch Spa. Also on Deck 8 is a large outdoor pool and terrace at the stern. The kennels, located aft on starboard side of Deck 12, are available only for transatlantic crossings. They can accommodate up to twenty two dogs (the kennels will also take cats) in small and large cages.

The King's Court area on the ship is open twenty four hours a day, serving as a buffet restaurant for breakfast and lunch. The overall space is divided into quarters, with each section decorated according to the theme of the four separate alternate dining venues that are "created" each evening through lighting, tableware, and menus: Lotus, which specialises in Asian cuisine; the Carvery, a British style grille; La Piazza, with Italian food; and the Chef's Galley, which offers an interactive experience to food preparation.

The passengers' dining arrangements on board are dictated by the type of accommodation in which they choose to travel.  Around 85% of passengers are in Britannia class, and, therefore, dine in the main restaurant. However, passengers can choose to upgrade to either a "junior suite", and dine in the "Princess Grill"', or a suite, and dine in the "Queens' Grill". Those in the two latter categories are grouped together by Cunard as "Grill Passengers", and they are permitted to use the "Queens' Grill Lounge" and a private outdoor area on deck 11 with its own whirlpool.Liverpool Daily Post "Queen Mary 2 Liverpool visit: The ship that offers her passengers 'trip of a lifetime'" 21 October 2009 This feature is also present on both Queen Victoria and Queen Elizabeth. However, all other public areas can be used by all passengers.

As the Britannia Restaurant takes up the full width of the ship on two decks, a 'tween deck, called Deck 3L, was devised to allow passengers to walk from the Grand Lobby to the Queen's Room without traversing the dining room mid-meal. The deck consists of two corridors that run beneath the upper balcony of the restaurant on Deck 3, and above the main dining area on Deck 2. This is why the balcony of the Britannia has tiers that step up towards the hull. This arrangement is illustrated on the hull where there is a stack of three rows of windows in the area where the main restaurant sits, the two upper and lower most rows illuminate the dining room, while the centre row serves Deck 3L. There is a similar arrangement through the Royal Court Theatre. As well, the passages that run on either side of Illuminations on Deck 3 ramp upwards to compensate for the change in deck elevation between the entrance to Illuminations and an elevator bank forward of the room.

More than 5,000 commissioned works of art are visible in Queen Mary 2's public rooms, corridors, staterooms and lobbies, having been created by 128 artists from sixteen countries. Two of the most notable pieces are Barbara Broekman's tapestry, an abstract depiction of an ocean liner, bridge, and New York skyline which spans the full height of the Britannia Restaurant, and the British sculptor John McKenna's sheet bronze relief mural in the Grand Lobby, a seven square metre portrait of the ship fabricated in bronze inspired by the Art Deco mural in the main dining room of the original Queen Mary. The 10th Deck Pavillion features a glass ellipse sculpture by Tomasz Urbanowicz called "Blue Sun Setting in the Ocean".

Technical aspects

Power plant and propulsion systemQueen Mary 2s power plant comprises four sixteen-cylinder Wärtsilä 16V46CR EnviroEngine marine diesel engines, generating a combined  at 514 rpm, and two General Electric LM2500+ gas turbines, provide a further ; these drive electric generators, which in turn provide the power to drive four  Alstom electrical motors located inside the podded propulsors (and thus entirely outside the vessel's hull).  Such an arrangement, known as integrated electric propulsion (IEP), provides for economical cruising at low speed combined with an ability to sustain much higher speeds when required, and has been common in naval vessels for several decades.

The propulsors are Rolls-Royce Mermaid azimuth thruster type podded propulsion units, each with one forward-facing low-vibration propeller with separately bolted blades. The forward pair of thrusters is fixed, but the aft pair can swivel through 360°, removing the need for a rudder. Queen Mary 2 is the first quadruple-propeller passenger ship completed since the SS France in 1961. Queen Mary 2 carries eight spare blades on the foredeck, immediately forward of the bridge screen.  In addition to the primary thrusters, the ship is also fitted with three bow thrusters, with a power output of 3.2 MW each. These allow the ship to turn in its own length while in port, to conduct more complex docking manoeuvres.

Unusually, Queen Mary 2s gas turbines are not housed along with her diesels in the engine room deep in her hull, but instead are in a soundproofed enclosure directly beneath the funnel. This arrangement allows the turbines to be supplied with sufficient air without having to run large diameter air ducts the height of the ship, which would have wasted valuable interior space.

Navigation
Queen Mary 2 has a fully integrated bridge system designed by British firm Kelvin Hughes, which controls the ship's navigation systems, radar, dynamic positioning system, and engine monitoring system. Kelvin Hughes supplied many of the ship's components, including the Electronic Chart Display and Information System (ECDIS) and eight multifunction display units.

Water supply
Fresh water aboard Queen Mary 2 is supplied by three seawater desalination plants. The plants' energy is supplied primarily by steam and cooling water from the ship's gas turbines and diesel engines, or if needed by steam from the ship's two oil-fired boilers. The traditional multiple-effect distillation technology has been improved for the ship's plant, so that scaling of plates is reduced, vastly reducing maintenance required. The desalinated water has a very low salt content of less than five parts per million. The ship could easily be supplied by only two of the three plants. If the engines are running on low load (when the ship is running at a slow speed) the engine jacket cooling water temperature is insufficient to heat the seawater to run the desalination plants. In that case steam from oil-fired boilers is used to heat the sea water. This is uneconomical as generating steam is expensive. It may be cheaper, therefore, to buy water in a particular port than to produce it on board. The seawater intakes are located in the hull of the ship. Concentrated salt solution (brine) is discharged to the sea closer to the ship's stern together with cooling water from the engines. An additional plant was added during the 2016 refit.

Service history

On 12 January 2004 Queen Mary 2 set sail on her maiden voyage from Southampton, England, to Fort Lauderdale, Florida, in the United States, carrying 2,620 passengers. She was under the command of captain Ronald Warwick, who had previously commanded Queen Elizabeth 2. Warwick is the son of William (Bill) Warwick, who had also been a senior Cunard officer and the first captain of Queen Elizabeth 2. The ship returned to Southampton late from her maiden voyage after bow doors covering the thrusters failed to shut in Portugal.

During the 2004 Summer Olympics Queen Mary 2 sailed to Athens and docked at Piraeus for two weeks for use as a floating hotel, serving the then Prime Minister of the United Kingdom Tony Blair and his wife Cherie, French President Jacques Chirac, then United States President George W. Bush, and the United States Olympic men's basketball team. According to Cunard, Queen Mary 2s passengers have also included jazz musician Dave Brubeck and singers Rod Stewart, Carly Simon, and James Taylor.

One 2005 transatlantic crossing saw Queen Mary 2 carrying, in a locked steamer trunk, the first United States copy of J. K. Rowling's book Harry Potter and the Half-Blood Prince, autographed by the author. In a promotional press release for the event, Cunard said that this marked the first time a book had been transported to its international launch aboard an ocean liner.

In January 2006 Queen Mary 2 embarked on a cruise to South America. Upon departure from Fort Lauderdale, one of her propeller pods was damaged when it struck a channel wall, forcing the ship to sail at a reduced speed, which resulted in Commodore Warwick's decision to skip several calls on its voyage to Rio de Janeiro. Many of her passengers threatened to stage a sit-in protest because of the missed calls, before Cunard offered to refund the voyage costs. Queen Mary 2 continued to operate at a reduced service speed and several itinerary changes were necessary until repairs had been completed after the ship returned to Europe in June, where Queen Mary 2 paid a visit to dry dock and the damaged propeller pod was unseated. In November, Queen Mary 2 was drydocked once more at the Blohm+Voss yard in Hamburg (drydock Elbe 17) for the reinstallation of the repaired propeller pod. At the same time, sprinkler systems were installed in all of the vessel's balconies to comply with new safety regulations which had come into effect since the MS Star Princess fire. Additionally, both bridge wings were extended by two metres to improve visibility.

After completing the journey around South America, on 23 February 2006, Queen Mary 2 met her namesake, the original , which is permanently docked at Long Beach, California. Escorted by a flotilla of smaller ships, the two Queens exchanged a "whistle salute" which was heard throughout the city of Long Beach. Queen Mary 2 met the other serving Cunard liners  and Queen Elizabeth 2 on 13 January 2008 near the Statue of Liberty in New York City harbour, with a celebratory fireworks display; Queen Elizabeth 2 and Queen Victoria made a tandem crossing of the Atlantic for the meeting. This marked the first time three Cunard Queens have been present in the same location. Cunard stated this would be the last time these three ships would ever meet, due to Queen Elizabeth 2'''s impending retirement from service in late 2008. However this would prove not to be the case, as the three Queens met in Southampton on 22 April 2008.[] Queen Mary 2 rendezvoused with Queen Elizabeth 2  in Dubai on Saturday 21 March 2009, after the latter ship's retirement, while both ships were berthed at Port Rashid. With the withdrawal of Queen Elizabeth 2 from Cunard's fleet and its docking in Dubai, Queen Mary 2 became the only ocean liner left in active passenger service.

On 3 August 2007 three men were stopped by police while escorting and piloting a replica of the first American combat submarine within  of Queen Mary 2, which was docked at the cruise ship terminal in Red Hook, Brooklyn. The replica was created by New York artist Philip "Duke" Riley and two out-of-town residents, one of whom claimed to be a descendant of David Bushnell, who had invented it. The Coast Guard issued Riley a citation for having an unsafe vessel, and for violating the security zone around Queen Mary 2.
On 19 October 2011, Queen Mary 2 had her registry changed to Hamilton, Bermuda, from her previous home port of Southampton, to allow the ship to host on-board weddings. This marked the first time in its 171-year history that Cunard has not had a ship registered within the UK. Bermuda is a member of the Red Ensign Group and the ship continues to fly the undefaced Red Ensign rather than the Bermuda Red Ensign.

World cruises

On 10 January 2007, Queen Mary 2 started her first world cruise, circumnavigating the globe in 81 days. On 20 February, she met her fleet-mate, Queen Elizabeth 2, also on her 2007 world cruise, in Sydney harbour.  This is the first time two Cunard Queens had been together in Sydney since the original Queen Mary and Queen Elizabeth served as troop ships in 1941. Despite the early arrival time of 5:42 am, the Queen Mary 2s presence attracted so many viewers that the Sydney Harbour Bridge and Anzac Bridge were blocked. With 1,600 passengers leaving the ships in Sydney, Cunard estimated the stopovers injected more than $3 million into the local economy.

On 10 January 2012, the ship embarked on a three-month world cruise from Southampton, travelling south and then east around Africa, a first ever circumnavigation of Australia, to Japan, then back to Southampton along the south coastline of Eurasia and through the Suez Canal.

Anniversary voyage
In October 2009, Queen Mary 2s fifth year in service was celebrated with an 8-night voyage around the British Isles. The voyage included maiden visits to Greenock and Liverpool.

The Boston Cup
Carried aboard Queen Mary 2 is the Boston Cup. Sometimes referred to as The Britannia Cup, this artifact was created for Sir Samuel Cunard in Boston, United States, to commemorate the arrival of his first vessel . Cunard had selected Boston as the American port for his Atlantic service, which resulted in a strong connection between Boston and the Cunard Line. It is believed that the cup was presented to Sir Samuel Cunard sometime in 1840, but for much of its life it was missing. It was discovered in an antique shop in 1967 and returned to Cunard, where it was placed aboard Queen Elizabeth 2. In 2004, when Queen Mary 2 became the flagship, the Boston Cup was placed aboard Queen Mary 2. It is in a glass case, aft of the Chart Room lounge.

In July 2007 the National Geographic Channel broadcast an episode of the documentary series Megastructures about Queen Mary 2. The vessel also featured in the pilot episode of the documentary TV series Mighty Ships.

Propulsion failures
The propulsor pods fitted to Queen Mary 2 have been prone to failure, attributed to the motors' thrust bearings, which continued to show a tendency to fail even after numerous attempts at redesign. In January 2009, Carnival, through its Cunard division, sued Rolls-Royce in the United States. The line alleged that the Mermaid pod propulsion systems fitted to Queen Mary 2 were inherently defective in design, and that Rolls-Royce knew about the design deficiencies and deliberately conspired to mislead, deceive and defraud in the course of winning the contract. In January 2011, the court awarded Carnival US$24 million (approximately UK£15 million at the time of verdict).

Cunard Royal Rendezvous
All three ships met in front of the statue of Liberty at 6:45 pm for Grucci fireworks. The Empire State Building was lit up in red to mark the event.

On 5 June 2012, the three Queens met again, but this time in Southampton to celebrate the Diamond jubilee of Queen Elizabeth II.

Atlantic rowingQueen Mary 2 has rendezvoused with ocean rowing teams in the middle of the Atlantic.  On 30 July 2010 she met up with Artemis Investments, whose rowing crew were Don Lennox, Livar Nysted, Ray Carroll, Leven Brown.  Carroll had been a former engineer and was patched through via marine VHF radio and Queen Mary 2's public address system to speak to the captain and crew. On 26 September 2013 Queen Mary 2 resupplied solo-rower Mylène Paquette and her vessel Hermel with a replacement satellite phone, drogue anchor and groceries. Queen Mary 2 changed her course by 20 degrees and only added  to the overall distance of the crossing.

Engine fire
A small fire broke out in the gas turbine engine room (located high on the ship behind the Queen Mary 2 sign) on the evening of 5 October 2011. The fire was started in one of the ship's gas turbines. No injuries were reported, and crew on board the ship safely extinguished the fire.

Plant incident
On 23 September 2010, an incident occurred in Queen Mary 2s aft harmonic filter room. This resulted in the shutdown of all four propulsion motors and a loss of electrical power throughout the ship. Within an hour, the ship's main generators were restarted and the ship was able to resume passage. Later investigations found that an explosion was caused by electrical arcing within the aft harmonic filter igniting leaked dielectric fluid vapour.

200th transatlantic voyage
On 6 July 2013 Queen Mary 2 departed New York en route to Southampton on her 200th transatlantic voyage. On board speakers were Stephen Payne OBE—the ship's designer—and presenter and newsreader Nick Owen, who presented talks about the ship's design.

10th birthday celebrations

On 6 May 2014, all three Queens met up for the first time in Lisbon, Portugal. The three ships sailed abreast of each other from Lisbon to Southampton. On 9 May 2014 Queen Elizabeth and Queen Victoria led Queen Mary 2 up the Southampton channel where they docked in formation at the QEII terminal and performed a birthday salute to Queen Mary 2.  The anniversary included a tour of the ship by His Royal Highness The Duke of Edinburgh.

Cunard 175th anniversary
On 25 May 2015, all three Queens met, once again, at Liverpool, in order to celebrate the 175th anniversary of the shipping line. After arriving at Liverpool the previous day, Queen Mary 2 made a brief excursion to the entrance of the River Mersey to welcome her two fleetmates into port in the early afternoon. The three Cunarders then sailed, in formation, towards Liverpool. The ships spent several hours together, before the departure of Queen Mary 2 to Saint Peter Port, Guernsey.

On 2 July 2015, Queen Mary 2 began a 175th Anniversary Crossing in Southampton. She sailed first to Liverpool, leaving that city after a fireworks display on 4 July, the actual anniversary date of Cunard's first transatlantic voyage. Queen Mary 2 followed the route of the original ship Britannia, calling first at Halifax, Nova Scotia. After a day there, she headed first upriver into the harbor, using her bow thrusters and swivel-pod motors to negotiate the tight turnaround to come back down close to the cityfront. A 21-gun salute and bagpipe band honored the ship.

From Halifax, the ship sailed to Boston and was there for a full day at the cruise terminal (Boston was the terminus of the original crossing in 1840). In the evening the ship backed out into Boston Harbor, where a fireworks display was presented before Queen Mary 2 sailed away. After a night and day at sea, the vessel entered New York Harbor early the morning of 14 July and docked at the Brooklyn Cruise Terminal. Later in the evening the vessel sailed to the lower harbor, between the Statue of Liberty and the Battery, for the Forever Cunard Queen Mary 2 Light Show.

2016 refit 
In June 2016, Queen Mary 2 underwent a $132 million/£90 million renovation at Blohm+Voss over 25 days. Major changes include the addition of fifteen single-occupancy staterooms, thirty additional balcony staterooms, and ten more animal cages for an enlarged kennels. According to Blohm+Voss, the refit included the installation of exhaust gas scrubbers and filters to reduce emissions.

Atlantic rescue
On 10 June 2017, Queen Mary 2, commanded by Captain Christopher Wells, came to the rescue of a stranded solo yachtsman, 73-year-old Mervyn Wheatley, whose craft Tamarind had been disabled by a strong storm while participating in the Observer Single-handed Trans-Atlantic Race. British and Canadian coastguards coordinated this long-range rescue after they detected Tamarind's distress beacon. Queen Mary 2 was guided to Wheatley's position by a Royal Air Force Lockheed C-130 Hercules aircraft.

COVID-19
When COVID-19 started to spread around in the world in 2020, Queen Mary 2 was in the midst of a world cruise. In early February, Cunard cancelled the Asian leg of the voyage, and the vessel stopped in Singapore only to refuel and sailed to Australia. On 15 March, Cunard cancelled the remainder of the voyage, disembarked all passengers at Fremantle, and ordered the ship back to Southampton. It stopped briefly on 2 April in Durban to disembark six South African crew members before continuing to its home port. Queen Mary 2 arrived back in Southampton on 15 April.

Due to the pandemic, Cunard suspended all voyages of the Queen Mary 2 until November 2021.  In August 2021 Cunard announced that the ship would enter drydock in Brest, France prior to her return to service. On 28 November 2021, Queen Mary 2 returned to service.

References

Notes

Bibliography

External links

 Cunard: Queen Mary 2, Official website
 Location tracking at MarineTraffic
 Queen Mary 2 (QM2) on Chris' Cunard Page
 Video Clips of QM2 at Newport and Boston
 "Queen Mary 2"—–review by Douglas Ward in The Daily Telegraph, London.

Ocean liners
Ships built by Chantiers de l'Atlantique
Ships built in France
Ships of the Cunard Line
2003 ships
Passenger ships of Bermuda